Patrik Lušňák (born November 6, 1988) is a Slovak professional ice hockey player. He is currently a free agent.

Playing career
Lušňák was playing junior ice hockey in ŠHK 37 Piešťany and HC Dukla Senica. He debuted at senior level in the 2005–06 season for ŠHK 37 Piešťany. He recorded 10 points in 10 games in 2005–06. In the next season he moved to North America to play for the OHL club Sudbury Wolves. He overall played 160 games and recorded 135 points for Sudbury.

In 2009 he came back to Europe, signing for the Czech Extraliga team HC Oceláři Třinec. He played 17 games and scored 2 goals for Třinec. In 2009 he joined HK 36 Skalica and stayed for three seasons before returning to the Czech Extraliga in 2012 with Piráti Chomutov. He returned to Slovakia the following year and signed for ŠHK 37 Piešťany before moving to the Belarusian Extraleague for Yunost Minsk.

In 2015, Lušňák moved to HC Slovan Bratislava of the Kontinental Hockey League. After two seasons he returned to Slovakia with HKm Zvolen and then with HC Košice.

International play
Lušňák participated at the 2008 World Junior Ice Hockey Championships, recording 5 points in 6 games. The Slovakia junior team finished 7th at the tournament. He debuted for the Slovakia senior team at the Deutschland Cup in 2011.

Career statistics

Regular season and playoffs

International

References

External links

1988 births
Living people
Sportspeople from Piešťany
ŠHK 37 Piešťany players
HK 36 Skalica players
Sudbury Wolves players
HC Košice players
HC Oceláři Třinec players
HC Havířov players
Piráti Chomutov players
HC Kometa Brno players
Yunost Minsk players
HC Slovan Bratislava players
HKM Zvolen players
HK Nitra players
HK Poprad players
Slovak ice hockey left wingers
Slovak expatriate ice hockey players in Canada
Slovak expatriate sportspeople in Belarus
Expatriate ice hockey players in Belarus